Comedy Central Extra is a European pay television channel that launched in the United Kingdom and Ireland in 2003, then followed by the Netherlands in 2011 where it was available until 31 December 2022. Between 2012 and 2020 it was also available in parts of Eastern Europe and the Balkans.

History
The channel launched as Paramount Comedy 2 in the UK and Ireland on 1 September 2003 on Sky, and followed soon after on 22 September 2003 on Telewest and 15 October 2003 on NTL. The channel was originally a so-called 'timeshift' service, offering programmes from Paramount Comedy at different times. It later started broadcasting some different programming from Paramount, often British.

On 17 February 2009, it was announced that both Paramount Comedy 1 and Paramount Comedy 2 would be re-branded as Comedy Central and Comedy Central Extra on 6 April 2009 at 9 pm. The name change coincided with the launch of a new programming line-up which included new episodes of Two and a Half Men, The Office and South Park.

On 1 November 2011, Comedy Central Extra launched a localised version in the Netherlands through cable operator Ziggo. Followed by KPN on 15 January 2012 and UPC Netherlands on 1 April 2012. Comedy Central Extra has been available in parts of Eastern Europe and between 1 August 2012 and 14 July 2020, in the Adriatic region: Bosnia and Herzegovina, Croatia, North Macedonia, Montenegro, Serbia and Slovenia.

Some of the programming of Comedy Central Family moved to Comedy Central Extra after the closure of Comedy Central Family in the Netherlands on 31 May 2018. On 10 November 2022, it was announced that Comedy Central Extra would close in the Netherlands on 31 December 2022.

Timeshift service
Within the UK and Ireland, a timeshift service called Comedy Central Extra +1 (formerly Paramount Comedy 2 +1 from 2007 to 2009) was launched on Sky on 5 November 2007. The channel reduced its hours to 7 pm – 6am on 4 August 2008, as Nicktoonsters launched on 18 August 2008. On 2 October 2012, the channel began to run full-time again following the closure of Nicktoons Replay. Coinciding with the closures of MTV OMG, MTV Rocks and Club MTV on 20 July 2020, the timeshift channel also closed as part of this change, along with the timeshifts for MTV and MTV Music.

Programming

Comedy Central Extra currently airs a variety of American comedy in the daytime. After 10 pm, the shows are a mix of American and British comedy.

In January 2007, the channel switched from mainly American programmes to classic British programming with shows such as Seinfeld, Cheers and Roseanne being replaced by Bless This House, George & Mildred and The Upper Hand.

In February 2007, the channel had a 'British Classics' season, with such hits as Spitting Image and Monty Python's Flying Circus.

At weekends, the channel used to screen classic British comedy such as The Upper Hand, Bless This House, George and Mildred, Brush Strokes, Monty Python's Flying Circus, Don't Wait Up and Mr. Bean.

See also
 Comedy Central UK
 List of programmes broadcast by Comedy Central (UK and Ireland)

References

External links
  UK
  Ireland

Comedy Central
Defunct television channels in the Netherlands
Television channels and stations established in 2011
Television channels and stations established in 2003
Sky television channels